This is a list of the governors of the province of Helmand, Afghanistan.

Governors of Helmand Province

See also
 List of Afghanistan governors

Notes

Helmand